A non-player character (NPC), or non-playable character, is any character in a game that is not controlled by a player. The term originated in traditional tabletop role-playing games where it applies to characters controlled by the gamemaster or referee rather than by another player. In video games, this usually means a character controlled by the computer (instead of a player) that has a predetermined set of behaviors that potentially will impact gameplay, but will not necessarily be the product of true artificial intelligence.

Role-playing games
In a traditional tabletop role-playing game such as Dungeons & Dragons, an NPC is a character portrayed by the gamemaster (GM). While the player characters (PCs) form the narrative's protagonists, non-player characters can be thought of as the "supporting cast" or "extras" of a roleplaying narrative. Non-player characters populate the fictional world of the game, and can fill any role not occupied by a player character. Non-player characters might be allies, bystanders or competitors to the PCs. NPCs can also be traders that trade currency for things such as equipment or gear. NPCs thus vary in their level of detail. Some may be only a brief description ("You see a man in a corner of the tavern"), while others may have complete game statistics and backstories.

There is some debate about how much work a gamemaster should put into an important NPC's statistics; some players prefer to have every NPC completely defined with stats, skills, and gear, while others define only what is immediately necessary and fill in the rest as the game proceeds. There is also some debate regarding the importance of fully defined NPCs in any given role-playing game (RPG), but it is general consensus that the more "real" the NPCs feel, the more fun players will have interacting with them in character.

Playability
In some games and in some circumstances, a player who is without a player character can temporarily take control of an NPC. Reasons for this vary, but often arise from the player not maintaining a PC within the group and playing the NPC for a session or from the player's PC being unable to act for some time (for example, because the PC is injured or in another location). Although these characters are still designed and normally controlled by the gamemaster, when players are given the opportunity to temporarily control these non-player characters, it gives them another perspective on the plot of the game. Some systems, such as Nobilis, encourage this in their rules.

In less traditional RPGs, narrative control is less strictly separated between gamemaster and players. In this case, the line between PC and NPC can be vague.

Dependants
Many game systems have rules for characters sustaining positive allies in the form of NPC followers; hired hands, or other dependant stature to the PC. Characters may sometimes help in the design, recruitment, or development of NPCs.

In the Champions game (and related games using the Hero System), a character may have a DNPC, or "dependant non-player character". This is a character controlled by the GM, but for which the player character is responsible in some way, and who may be put in harm's way by the PC's choices.

Video games

The term "non-player character" is also used in video games to describe entities not under the direct control of a player. The term carries a connotation that the character is not hostile towards players; hostile characters are referred to as enemies, mobs, or creeps.

NPC behavior in computer games is usually scripted and automatic, triggered by certain actions or dialogue with the player characters. In certain multi-player games (Neverwinter Nights and Vampire: The Masquerade series, for example) a player that acts as the GM can "possess" both player and non-player characters, controlling their actions in order to further the storyline.  More complex games, such as the aforementioned Neverwinter Nights, allow the player to customize the NPCs' behavior by modifying their default scripts or creating entirely new ones.

In some online games, such as massively multiplayer online role-playing games, NPCs may be entirely unscripted, and are essentially regular character avatars controlled by employees of the game company. These "non-players" are often distinguished from player characters by avatar appearance or other visual designation, and often serve as in-game support for new players. In other cases, these "live" NPCs are virtual actors, playing regular characters that drive a continuing storyline (as in Myst Online: Uru Live).

In early and less advanced RPGs, NPCs only had monologue. Code directs the appearance of a dialogue box, floating text, cutscene, or other means of displaying the NPCs' speech or reaction to the player. NPC speeches of this kind are often designed to give an instant impression of the character of the speaker, providing character vignettes, but they may also advance the story or illuminate the world around the PC. Similar to this is the most common form of storytelling, non-branching dialogue, in which the means of displaying NPC speech are the same as above, but the player character or avatar responds to or initiates speech with NPCs. In addition to the purposes listed above, this enables development of the player character.

More advanced RPGs feature interactive dialogue, or branching dialogue (dialogue trees). An example are the games produced by Black Isle Studios and White Wolf, Inc.; every one of their games is multiple-choice roleplaying. When talking to an NPC, the player is presented with a list of dialogue options, and may choose between them. Each choice may result in a different response from the NPC. These choices may affect the course of the game, as well as the conversation. At the least, they provide a reference point to the player of their character's relationship with the game world.

Ultima is an example of a game series that has advanced from non-branching (Ultima III: Exodus and earlier) to branching dialogue (from Ultima IV: Quest of the Avatar and on). Other role-playing games with branching dialogues include Cosmic Soldier, Megami Tensei, Fire Emblem, Metal Max, Langrisser, SaGa, Ogre Battle, Chrono, Star Ocean, Sakura Wars, Mass Effect, Dragon Age, Radiant Historia, and several Dragon Quest and Final Fantasy games.

Certain video game genres revolve almost entirely around interactions with non-player characters, including visual novels such as Ace Attorney and dating sims such as Tokimeki Memorial, usually featuring complex branching dialogues and often presenting the player's possible responses word-for-word as the player character would say them. Games revolving around relationship-building, including visual novels, dating sims such as Tokimeki Memorial, and some role-playing games such as Persona, often give choices that have a different number of associated "mood points" that influence a player character's relationship and future conversations with a non-player character. These games often feature a day-night cycle with a time scheduling system that provides context and relevance to character interactions, allowing players to choose when and if to interact with certain characters, which in turn influences their responses during later conversations.

Insult

On the Internet, NPC is often used as an insult to suggest that some people are unable to form thoughts or opinions of their own. Such people are often characterized as being similar to NPC Wojak, who is a grey-faced, expressionless internet meme.

See also
 AI player
 Philosophical zombie
 Video game bot

References

MUD terminology
Role-playing game terminology
Video game terminology